Verónica is a Mexican telenovela produced by Valentín Pimstein for Televisa in 1980.

Cast 
Julissa as Verónica
Ricardo Blume as César
Aldo Monti as Federico
Christian Bach as María Teresa
Ariadne Welter as Herminia
María Rivas as Marcelina
Elsa Cárdenas as Leonor
Nelly Meden as Esther
Martha Verduzco as Katy
Alejandra Peniche as Malina
Yuri as Norma
Lola Tinoco as Petrita
Roberto Ballesteros as Lisandro
Lupelena Goyeneche as Domitila

References

External links 

Mexican telenovelas
1980 telenovelas
Televisa telenovelas
Spanish-language telenovelas
1980 Mexican television series debuts
1980 Mexican television series endings